Stoodleigh is a village and civil parish in the Mid Devon district of Devon, England, located  north of Tiverton and  south of Bampton. The centre of the village is a conservation area.

In the past it formed part of Witheridge Hundred and it is within the Tiverton Deanery of the Church of England.

Castle Close

Castle Close is a circular earthwork, close to Stoodleigh, that is most likely to be an Iron Age Hill fort or enclosure.

Church of St Margaret's
The Church of St Margaret's was constructed in the 15th century and was extensively restored in 1782. It contains a Norman font which is likely to have come from an earlier church in the parish where the first recorded incumbent was installed in 1264.

Stoodleigh Beacon
Stoodleigh Beacon is situated about 2 miles west of Stoodleigh village. It was anciently known as Warbrighsleigh, Warbrightley, Warpsley, etc., also the name of the high hill on which it stood. The beacon was ordered to be set up by King Edward II (1307-1327) "when he doubted of the landing of his queen Isabel and Sir John (sic) of Henold" (Risdon) This refers to Isabel's Invasion of England in 1326, having betrothed her son Prince Edward to Philippa of Hainault, the daughter of
William I, Count of Hainaut, from whom she received a substantial dowry and several warships.
In the 16th and 17th centuries the estate of Warbrighsleigh, etc., was the seat of the Broughton family.

References

External links

Villages in Mid Devon District
Civil parishes in Devon